The 2017–18 season was Middlesbrough's first season back in the Championship, making an immediate return to the division following relegation from the Premier League in the previous season. In their 142nd year in existence, the club also competed in the FA Cup and the EFL Cup.

The season covers the period from 1 July 2017 to 30 June 2018, with all competitive games played between August 2017 and May 2018. Two transfer windows took place, the first from 1 July to 31 August 2017, the second from 1 January to 31 January 2018.

Garry Monk was appointed as manager in June 2017, however he parted company with the club in late December after an unconvincing start to the season, with the club in 9th position. Tony Pulis replaced him on 26 December, and took charge of the team after Middlesbrough's Boxing Day fixture against Bolton Wanderers.

Changes
The first and most crucial change this season is that the club will play in the EFL Championship, having been relegated from the Premier League in the previous season. Aitor Karanka, who had managed the club from November 2013, was sacked in March 2017 after a poor run of results, having not won in ten matches and having occupied a place in the relegation zone. Prior to his sacking, tensions had mounted between Karanka and both the club's board and fans surrounding Middlesbrough's January transfer activity and frustration from supporters over the poor results and perceived poor style of play. Karanka's assistant manager, Steve Agnew, served as caretaker manager until the end of the season. On 9 June 2017, it was confirmed that former Swansea City and Leeds United manager Garry Monk would become the new manager for the 2017–18 season.

Nathan Convery, Bradley Fewster, Brandon Holdsworth, Lewis Maloney, Niall McGoldrick, Junior Mondal, Josef Wheatley, Matthew Wilson, Víctor Valdés, Brad Guzan and Viktor Fischer were amongst the first players to leave the club in the summer 2017 transfer window. Further departures would include Bernardo Espinosa and Cristhian Stuani, who both completed moves to Girona, while James Husband would leave for Norwich City, defender Antonio Barragán would depart on a season-long loan to Spanish club Real Betis, midfielder Gastón Ramírez would depart for Sampdoria, and the club also terminated the contract of Carlos de Pena by mutual consent.

Monk's first major signings included Norwich City midfielder Jonny Howson, Derby County right-back Cyrus Christie, Toulouse striker Martin Braithwaite, Nottingham Forest striker
Britt Assombalonga, as well as goalkeeper Darren Randolph, and striker Ashley Fletcher, both moving from West Ham United.

Squad

First team squad

 L = Player on Loan

Pre-season

Friendlies
As of 3 July 2017, Middlesbrough have announced five pre-season friendlies, against Mansfield Town, Rochdale, Oxford United, Chesterfield and FC Augsburg.

Competitions

Championship

League table

Result summary

Results by matchday

Matches

Football League play-offs

FA Cup
In the FA Cup, Middlesbrough entered the competition in the third round and were drawn at home versus Sunderland.
Boro beat the Black Cats 2–0 at the Riverside.

The Monday after Boro were drawn with who ever won that night's game between Brighton and Crystal Palace.
The Seagulls (Brighton) won the game 2–1, meaning that Boro will play them in the 4th round, on the Weekend of the 27th of January.

EFL Cup
Middlesbrough entered the 2017–18 EFL Cup in the Second Round, and were drawn at home to Scunthorpe United. An away trip against Aston Villa was confirmed for the third round. A fourth round trip to AFC Bournemouth was announced.

Transfers

Transfers in

Transfers out

Loans in

Loans out

Statistics

Appearances

Top scorers
The list is sorted by shirt number when total goals are equal.

Notes

References

Middlesbrough F.C. seasons
Middlesbrough